Mark Valeryevich Kondratiuk (born 3 September 2003) is a Russian figure skater. He is a 2022 Olympic champion in the team event, 2022 European champion, a two-time Challenger Series medalist and the 2022 Russian national champion.

Personal life
Kondratiuk was born on 3 September 2003 in Podolsk, Russia. After a visit to the Tate Modern Museum , he became interested in art and started painting. His favorite artists are Kazimir Malevich, Jean-Michel Basquiat, and Hieronymus Bosch.

As of 2022, Kondratiuk is dating the 2022 Beijing Olympic silver medalist Alexandra Trusova. 

In December 2022, the Ukrainian Parliament sanctioned Kondratiuk for his support of the 2022 Russian invasion of Ukraine.

Career

Early years 
Kondratiuk began learning to skate in 2006. As a child, he was coached by Lyudmila Sapronova.

By 2016, he was being coached by Svetlana Sokolovskaia. He placed sixteenth at the 2017 Russian Junior Championships. Over the following seasons, he appeared at several junior internationals, winning five medals, but received no ISU Junior Grand Prix assignments. Kondratiuk was diagnosed with Osgood–Schlatter disease at age 13; as a result, he missed multiple seasons of competition and briefly considered leaving the sport before opting to continue.

2019–20 season 
In November, making his senior international debut, Kondratiuk won gold at the Bosphorus Cup in Turkey. In January, he took silver at the Mentor Toruń Cup in Poland.

2020–21 season 
Competing on the domestic Russian Cup series, Kondratiuk placed eighth in the first stage in Moscow and seventh in the fourth stage in Kazan. These results qualified him only as an alternate for the 2021 Russian Championships initially, but he was added to the roster following the withdrawal of Artur Danielian, the previous year's silver medalist.

Ranked third in the short program and second in the free skate, he won the bronze medal at the event, which took place in Chelyabinsk in December. Kondratiuk was a virtual unknown before the championship, making his bronze medal a considerable surprise, with commentators remarking that he "basically came out of nowhere."

Kondratiuk's success at the national championships led to his being invited to compete in the 2021 Channel One Trophy team competition, where he was selected for the "Time of Firsts" team captained by Evgenia Medvedeva. He ranked third in the short program and finished first in the free skate, ahead of national champion Mikhail Kolyada. He subsequently expressed a hope to qualify for the second Russian men's berth at the 2021 World Championships by competing at the Russian Cup Final.  Kondratiuk struggled at the event, placing fifth overall.

2021–22 season 
Kondratiuk was initially scheduled to make his ISU Junior Grand Prix debut at the first of two JGP events held in Courchevel, France, in August 2021, but he, along with his Russian teammates, was forced to withdraw from the competition as Russia's Sputnik V COVID-19 vaccine did not meet France's standards for adequate vaccination. After a strong performance at the senior Russian test skates, he was instead assigned to the 2021 CS Nebelhorn Trophy to qualify for a third Olympic berth for Russian men following the results of the 2021 World Championships earlier in the year. Kondratiuk was successful in his endeavour, placing fifth in the short program and second in the free skate to win the bronze medal and take the third of seven available Olympic spots.

Kondratiuk competed at a second Challenger event, taking the silver medal at the 2021 CS Denis Ten Memorial Challenge. He was then assigned to make his Grand Prix debut at the 2021 Rostelecom Cup, where he placed eighth. 

At the 2022 Russian Championships, Kondratiuk placed second in the short program with a score of 97.77, 0.26 behind segment leader Evgeni Semenenko. He was only third in the free skate but narrowly won the gold medal, 0.67 points ahead of silver medalist Mikhail Kolyada. He described himself as shocked, deferring to Kolyada as "leader of the Russian men's team" despite the result, adding, "today I might be the leader, but overall I am not."

Making his debut at the European championships in Tallinn, Kondratiuk skated a clean short program and placed second in the segment, 0.70 points behind segment leader Andrei Mozalev. He went on to win the free skate and take the gold medal. Kondratiuk deemed the result a "kind of miracle," as he had only been hoping for a placement in the top three. On January 20, he was officially named to the Russian Olympic team.

Kondratiuk began the Games as the Russian entry in the men's short program of the Olympic team event. Skating cleanly, albeit with a few held landings, he placed third behind Nathan Chen and Shoma Uno, securing eight points for the Russian team. In the free program, Kondratiuk doubled the planned triple Salchow in his triple Lutz-Euler-triple Salchow combination, but otherwise skated cleanly to finish second in the segment behind Yuma Kagiyama and earn nine more points towards Team Russia's combined score. Team Russia, composed of Kondratiuk, Kamila Valieva, pairs skaters Anastasia Mishina / Aleksandr Galliamov, and ice dancers Victoria Sinitsina / Nikita Katsalapov, ultimately took the gold medal ahead of Team USA and Team Japan. Kondratiuk became the youngest Olympic champion in the team event at 18 years and 157 days old, being 45 days younger than Dick Button, who won the men's singles at 18 years and 202 days. He next competed in the men's event, placing fifteenth in the short program. Fourteenth in the free skate, he remained in fifteenth overall.

Programs

Competitive highlights 
GP: Grand Prix; CS: Challenger Series; JGP: Junior Grand Prix

Detailed results 
Small medals for short and free programs are awarded only at ISU Championships.

Senior level 

Personal ISU bests highlighted in bold. Personal bests highlighted in italic.

Junior level 
Personal junior bests highlighted in italic.

References

External links 
 

2003 births
Russian male single skaters
Living people
Figure skaters at the 2022 Winter Olympics
Olympic figure skaters of Russia
Medalists at the 2022 Winter Olympics
Olympic medalists in figure skating
Olympic gold medalists for the Russian Olympic Committee athletes
People from Podolsk
Sportspeople from Moscow Oblast